Valmet Automotive (formerly known as Saab-Valmet) is a Finnish vehicle contract manufacturer and supplier for the development and production of battery systems as well as a supplier for roof and kinematic systems.

In its development, the Valmet Automotive Group focuses on electromobility with the development and production of battery modules and complete battery packs for electrified vehicles. In addition to the vehicle plant in Uusikaupunki, the company operates battery plants in Salo and Uusikaupunki in Finland and in Kirchardt, Germany. Valmet Automotive has sites in Finland, Germany and Poland. The largest shareholders in Valmet Automotive Group are the Finnish state investment company Tesi and Pontos Group, each with a 38.46 percent stake. 23.08 percent is held by China's Contemporary Amperex Technology Limited (CATL).

Expertise

Valmet Automotive has three business lines: Vehicle Manufacturing, EV Systems, and Roof & Kinematic Systems.

In vehicle manufacturing, Valmet Automotive's customer references include Mercedes-Benz, Porsche, Saab, Opel and Fisker. Valmet Automotive has electric vehicles in series production since 2009. In July 2021 Valmet Automotive announced to be selected to build long-range solar cars for Lightyear. Valmet Automotive has also announced the manufacturing contract with Sono Motors for the Sion model in 2022.

In July 2012, Daimler AG and Valmet Automotive announced a manufacturing agreement Mercedes-Benz A-Class for the Uusikaupunki, Finland, plant. Production began in August 2013. A contract for the production of the Mercedes-Benz GLC-Class was announced in November 2015. The GLC production started in February 2017. In March 2017, Valmet Automotive announced the manufacturing contract with Daimler AG for the next generation Mercedes-Benz compact cars. While the production of the GLC ended in 2022, Valmet Automotive announced a manufacturing contract for the Mercedes-AMG GT 4-Door Coupé.

In the EV Systems business line, Valmet Automotive operates two battery pack production facilities in Salo, Finland, and in Uusikaupunki, Finland. The battery plant in Salo, Finland started large-scale production of 48-volt systems in 2019, and the expansion to include production of high-voltage batteries was completed in the summer of 2021. The battery plant in Uusikaupunki was opened in September 2021; high-voltage batteries for electric vehicles are manufactured there under one roof with vehicle production. A third battery plant in Kirchardt, Germany, is under construction and will open in 2022. Valmet Automotive also has sites for battery testing and engineering in Bad Friedrichshall, Weihenbronn, Munich and Turku (Finland).

In 2010, Valmet Automotive took over Karmann's roof business and continued operations at the Osnabrück, Germany, and Żary, Poland sites. In 2016, it was decided to expand the Roof Systems business to include Kinematic Systems. Kinematic Systems comprises the development and production of spoiler systems to reduce fuel consumption and optimize the range of electrically powered vehicles. The product range also includes kinematic solutions for electric vehicles such as electric charging flaps.
The customer reference list of the Roof & Kinematic Systems business line includes brands such as Mercedes-Benz, BMW, Mini (BMW Group), Bentley, McLaren Automotive and Porsche.

History

Saab-Valmet was established in 1968 as a joint venture of Finnish Valmet and Swedish Saab-Scania. The automotive plant was placed in Uusikaupunki, Finland and assembled only Saabs for the first eleven years. Between 1979 and 1985, Valmet also assembled Talbots; a total of 31,978 such cars were built in Finland. Valmet were only really interested in building the compact Simca-Talbot Horizon, but the French company required Valmet to also assemble the larger (and slow selling) 1307 before they would license the Horizon. Unlike Saabs, the Simca-Talbots were only meant for local consumption, although a clause in the contract allowed for the possibility of exports if parts made by the thirty local suppliers began to be exported to Talbot's main plants. Domestic parts content increased to thirty percent within a half year of manufacture commencing.

In 1992 Valmet became the sole owner, and the company was renamed Valmet Automotive in 1995. From 1999 to 2010, the sole owner was Metso, after which both Finnish Industry Investment (Tesi) and Pontos Investments bought 34% of the company's shares. On November 4, 2010, Valmet Automotive bought Karmann’s roof-component sections in Osnabrück, Germany, and Żary, Poland. In January 2017, CATL became a 23.08% minority stakeholder in the company, the other shareholders being Pontos and Tesi (Finnish Industry Investment).

Production

Present production
Lightyear (2022-2023)
Lightyear 0 production started in November 2022 and was cancelled January 2023 
Mercedes-Benz (2013–present)
Mercedes-Benz A-Class (W177) production started in August 2018
Mercedes-AMG GT 4-Door Coupé (X290) production starts in third quarter 2023

Past production
 Saab (1969–2003)
 Saab 95
 Saab 96
 Saab 99
 Saab 90
 Saab 900
 Saab 900 Convertible
 Saab 900 CD
 Saab 9000
 Saab 9-3 Convertible
 Specialized Saab models (e.g. Saab 9-3 Viggen, Saab 900 Convertible, the LWB Finnish domestic market versions of Saab 99 and Saab 900 aka. the Saab 99 and 900 "Finlandia" 5D combi-coupe and as the 900 CD in 4D Sedan form, seemingly popular with Finnish municipal and federal governments and major Finnish industrial corporations as an official executive car. Etc.)
 Chrysler/Talbot (1979–1987)
 Simca-Talbot Horizon
 Simca 1307/1508, Talbot 1510
 Talbot Solara
 Opel (1991–1997)
Opel Calibra
 Lada (1996–1998)
 Lada EuroSamara
 Porsche (1997–2011)
 Porsche Boxster
 Porsche Cayman
 Garia electric golf car (2009–2011)
 Think electric car (2009–2011)
Th!nk City
 Fisker Automotive (2011–2012)
Fisker Karma
Mercedes-Benz (2013–present)
Mercedes-Benz A-Class (W176) production started in August 2013 and production ended in 2018
Mercedes-Benz GLC-Class (X253) (2017–2022)
 Valmet Automotive
 Valmet Raceabout, a limited-series sports roadster.

Future production
Sono Motors (2023, expected)
Sono Motors Sion production expected to start late 2023

Gallery

References

External links

Valmet Automotive company pages

Valmet
Automotive companies of Finland
Sports car manufacturers
Plug-in hybrid vehicle manufacturers
Vehicle manufacturing companies established in 1968
Finnish brands
Uusikaupunki
Contract vehicle manufacturers
Finnish companies established in 1968
1968 establishments in Finland